Merton Park railway station was a railway station in Merton, Surrey, serving both the West Croydon to Wimbledon Line and the Tooting, Merton and Wimbledon Railway. Closed in 1997, part of the site now serves as a tram stop on the Wimbledon branch of the Tramlink network.

History

The station opened as part of the newly constructed Tooting, Merton and Wimbledon Railway on 1 October 1868 at the junction with the existing West Croydon to Wimbledon Line. Initially named Lower Merton, it was renamed Merton Park on 1 September 1887.

Two platforms served the new line via Merton Abbey to Tooting Junction station with a third entering service on 1 November 1870 to serve the single track West Croydon to Wimbledon Line.

The Tooting platforms were suspended from use between 1 January 1917 and 27 August 1923 as a wartime cost-saving measure, eventually closing permanently on 3 March 1929 when the line was closed to passengers. Continuing in use for freight services through to 1975 after which the track was eventually lifted and most of the platforms fenced off. Limited passenger access was maintained, however, as it was necessary to cross both platforms and the intervening trackbed to reach platform 3 and the West Croydon to Wimbledon Line. Initially, a wooden walkway was laid across the trackbed, eventually replaced with a raised earth walkway.

Access to the station buildings was via the single entrance on Rutlish Road, a public footpath running alongside the line from (now demolished) signal box at the Kingston Road level crossing providing an alternative route for pedestrians.

Closure and Tramlink

Merton Park station continued to serve the West Croydon to Wimbledon Line until its withdrawal from service after the last train on 31 May 1997 and conversion into a stop on the Wimbledon branch of the Tramlink network. Merton Park tram stop now overlaps the site of the original station, the tram lines occupying the site of the trackbed and platform of the old line.

The original station building has been converted into a private house, forming part of a small housing development covering some of the original station site.

Part of the nearby long public footbridge (crossing both lines to provide access to playing fields from Dorset Road) is now located at Corfe Castle station on the Swanage Railway following its removal on closure of the Croydon line.

See also
List of closed railway stations in London

References

Disused railway stations in the London Borough of Merton
Railway stations in Great Britain opened in 1868
Railway stations in Great Britain closed in 1997
Former Tooting, Merton and Wimbledon Railway stations